Channell is a surname. Notable people with the surname include:

 Arthur Moseley Channell (1838–1928), English rower and judge
 Carl Channell, American political fundraiser
 Craig Channell (born 1962) is a Canadian ice hockey player
 Fred Channell (1910–1975), English footballer
 Ian Brackenbury Channell, stage name The Wizard of New Zealand (born 1932), New Zealand educator
 Les Channell (1886–1954), American baseball player was a Major League Baseball